Blaise Koissy (born 12 January 1980) is an Ivorian striker who played for CS Sfaxien.

Career
Born Adjamé, Koissy began his football career with local side AS Athlétic d'Adjamé in 2000. He joined local rivals Stella Club d'Adjamé before starring at Africa Sports d'Abidjan where he would lead the league in scoring. As a result, CS Sfaxien manager Michel Decastel signed Koissy on a 3.5-year contract. Koissy enjoyed a successful six-year spell with CS Sfaxien.

Koissy was reported to be a target of Algerian club ES Setif in June 2007.

References

1980 births
Living people
Ivorian footballers
Association football forwards
CS Sfaxien players